"Det burde ikk være sådan her" is a Danish language debut single written and performed by Xander (full name Alexander Theo Linnet) from his album Over skyer, under vand.

"Det burde ikk være sådan her" (Danish: It Shouldn't Be Like This) was released on Artpeople label in October 2010 entering Tracklisten, the official Danish Singles Chart dated 8 October 2010 and reached the top of chart on 31 December 2010 staying for one week. The single returned to the top of the chart once again on 7 January 2011 for one more week.

The official music video was directed by Uffe Truust Video and produced by Esben Staun-Olsen.

Year-end charts

References

2010 singles
Number-one singles in Denmark
Danish-language songs
2010 songs